The Chinese Football Association Division Two League (Simplified Chinese: 中国足球协会乙级联赛), or China League Two, is the third tier league of the People's Republic of China. The league is under the auspices of the Chinese Football Association. Above the League Two is the premier league - the Chinese Super League and the League One.

The league below China League Two is the Chinese Champions League.

There are two groups in League Two, northern and southern. The top four teams from each group enter the promotion play-off after each regular season. Harbin Songbei Yiteng and Chongqing F.C. reached promotion play-off final in 2011 and the two clubs were promoted to League One. In 2011, China League Two 3rd-placed team faced 2011 China League One last-placed team for a play-off match. Fujian Smart Hero which was the 3rd-placed team of 2011 China League Two has won this match against the 2011 China League One last-placed team Guizhou Zhicheng and earned a spot in the 2012 China League One.

Clubs Locations

Former clubs

Winners

Sponsors

See also
China League One
Chinese FA Cup
Chinese Football Association
Chinese Super League

References

External links
China League Two official website 
News at Sohu 
League history at The Chinese Soccer Statistics Collection 
League history at RSSSF

 
3
Third level football leagues in Asia
Sports leagues in China
Professional sports leagues in China